Kaleke Mandi is a town of Hafizabad District in the Punjab province of Pakistan. It is located at 31°21'0N 72°46'0E with an altitude of 187 metres (616 feet).  

Kaleke Mandi objects count

Sustenance

Education

Transportation

Entertainment, Art&Culture

City services

Other

Financial

City name: Kaleke Mandi

Country: Pakistan

Population: 30k+

Languages: Panjabi(Punjabi), Sindhi, Pashto(Pushto), Urdu, English

Currency: Rupee

TimeZone: Asia/Karach

References

Shahid Nawaz kaleke Mandi  

Populated places in Hafizabad District